French's Mill is a historic grist mill at the junction of Augusta-Ford Hill and Fairground Roads in Augusta, West Virginia.  Its main building is a three-story wood-frame building with a metal roof, asphalt siding, and a concrete foundation.  It was built in 1911 on the site of a c. 1890s grist mill that was destroyed by fire.  The mill, which was originally water-powered, was converted to operate by electric power in 1949, and ceased operations in 2000.  It was also updated in the mid-20th century to accommodated different types of grain, illustrating the evolutionary change of these industrial facilities.

The mill was listed on the National Register of Historic Places in 2014.

See also
List of historic sites in Hampshire County, West Virginia
National Register of Historic Places listings in Hampshire County, West Virginia

References

External links 

Buildings and structures in Hampshire County, West Virginia
National Register of Historic Places in Hampshire County, West Virginia
Grinding mills in West Virginia
Grinding mills on the National Register of Historic Places in West Virginia
1911 establishments in West Virginia
Industrial buildings completed in 1911